Gấc [IPA ɣək̚˧˦] (Momordica cochinchinensis) is a type of perennial melon grown throughout Southeast Asian countries and Northeastern Australia. Gấc is notable for its vivid orange-reddish color resulting from its rich content of beta-carotene and lycopene.

Etymology 
As  originated in Vietnam, it is commonly called by its Vietnamese name.

The species name cochinchinensis derives from the Cochinchina region in the southern part of Vietnam, although it is grown and consumed in many parts of the world.

History 
Sprengel found that the plant belonged to the Linnean genus Momordica and changed its name in 1826.

Characteristics
Gấc grows as dioecious vines, meaning its male and female flowers are on separate plants, producing flowers typically  in length. In one season, a plant can produce from 30 to 60 fruits.

Fruit 

Upon ripening, gấc gradually changes colors, from green to yellow, orange and finally red when it can be harvested. At this time, the fruit is hard, but turns soft quickly, creating a challenge for storage and transportation.

Gấc fruit has a mild taste and dense flesh (mesocarp). The inside of a gấc fruit comprises two parts: fruit (yellow) and seed membrane (red color). Larger fruits have a higher percentage of edible aril than smaller fruits.

Breeding and cultivation
As gac plant is dioecious, both male and female plants are needed; hence, farmers must have at least one corresponding male plant growing in or around the gardens for the fruit-bearing female plants to be pollinated. When grown from seed, the ratio of male to female plants is unpredictable.

Pollination may be facilitated by insects, but hand pollination allows for better fruit yield. An alternative method is to graft female material onto the main shoot of a male plant.

For maximum insect-aided pollination, the recommended ratio is about 1 male for every 10 female plants.

Apart from Southeast Asian countries where the fruits are native, gac can be grown in sub-tropical climate regions. Cool temperatures inhibit growth.

Uses 

 has been commonly used in its native countries, mainly as food and traditional medicine.

The aril surrounding  seeds when the fruits are ripe is cooked with sticky rice to make , a traditional Vietnamese dish in red color served at weddings and New Year celebrations. In addition, the immature green fruit is also used as a vegetable in India. The spiny skin is removed and the fruits are sliced and cooked sometimes with potato or bottle gourd. In Sri Lanka,  is used in curry, and in Thailand,  is served with ice cream.

Due to the high contents of beta-carotene and lycopene, extracts from the fruit's arils are used to manufacture dietary supplements in soft capsules or are sometimes mixed into beverages.

Composition
Gac fruit, seeds, and seed oil contain substantial amounts of beta-carotene and lycopene which collectively impart the characteristic red-orange color to the fruit's tissues. Both aril and seeds are rich in monounsaturated and polyunsaturated fatty acids, with oil containing 69% unsaturated fats, including 35% as polyunsaturated fats. Gac has a high concentration of linoleic acid (omega-6) and omega-3 fatty acids.

References

External links

Dietary supplements
Dioecious plants
Edible fruits
Medicinal plants of Asia
Medicinal plants of Oceania
Momordica
Plants used in traditional Chinese medicine